Espanola High School may refer to:

Espanola High School (Espanola, Ontario) in Espanola, Ontario, Canada
Española Valley High School in Espanola, New Mexico, United States